West Vero Corridor is a census-designated place (CDP) in Indian River County, Florida, United States. The population was 7,138 at the 2010 census, down from 7,695 at the 2000 census. It is part of the Sebastian–Vero Beach Metropolitan Statistical Area.

Geography
West Vero Corridor is located southeast of the geographic center of Indian River County at  (27.640013, -80.496557), extending  along both sides of Florida State Road 60 west of the city Vero Beach. It is bordered to the east by the Vero Beach South CDP and to the west by Interstate 95. I-95 leads north  to Melbourne and south  to Fort Pierce.

Demographics

As of the census of 2000, there were 7,695 people, 4,235 households, and 2,426 families residing in the CDP. The racial makeup of the CDP was 98.22% White, 0.23% African American, 0.17% Native American, 0.40% Asian, 0.03% Pacific Islander, 0.60% from other races, and 0.35% from two or more races. Hispanic or Latino of any race were 2.11% of the population.

There were 4,235 households, out of which 7.1% had children under the age of 18 living with them, 50.9% were married couples living together, 4.6% had a female householder with no husband present, and 42.7% were non-families. 39.0% of all households were made up of individuals, and 32.5% had someone living alone who was 65 years of age or older.  The average household size was 1.78 and the average family size was 2.26.

In the CDP, the population was spread out, with 7.0% under the age of 18, 2.1% from 18 to 24, 10.3% from 25 to 44, 16.8% from 45 to 64, and 63.9% who were 65 years of age or older.  The median age was 72 years. For every 100 females, there were 78.3 males.  For every 100 females age 18 and over, there were 76.3 males.

The median income for a household in the CDP was $33,975, and the median income for a family was $38,175. Males had a median income of $28,301 versus $25,488 for females. The per capita income for the CDP was $24,619.  About 4.4% of families and 7.3% of the population were below the poverty line, including 15.6% of those under age 18 and 5.3% of those age 65 or over.

Government

The West Vero Corridor community is a census designated place, governed by Board of County Commissioners. Indian River County is divided into five county commission districts. The West Vero Corridor is represented jointly by Districts 1 and 3. All governmental functions are carried out by the county departments.

Police protection is provided by the Indian River County Sheriff's Office. The Sheriff's Office provides coverage for all unincorporated areas of the county from their headquarters in Vero Beach.

Fire and EMS services are provided by Stations 7 and 14 of the Indian Rivers County Fire Rescue.

References

Census-designated places in Indian River County, Florida
Census-designated places in Florida